A party spokesperson (also known as party spokesman or party spokeswoman) is any member of a political party (at any regional level of the party structure) who is charged by the leaders of the party with communicating the party's position on specific portfolios. Party spokespersons largely feature in political parties of parliamentary systems. Party spokespersons can also be assisted in their duties by deputy or assistant spokespersons in the same portfolio.

In Canada, non-government party spokespersons are known as party critics and deputy party critics, respectively.

Parliamentary party spokespersons
Spokespersons of a ruling party are coterminous with their roles as ministers in the government cabinet, and spokespersons of the leading opposition party (usually in Westminster system parliaments, where they're called the "Official Opposition") are coterminous with their roles as shadow ministers in the shadow cabinet; both are usually called "frontbenchers". A minor parliamentary/legislative party (be it in or out of coalition with a government cabinet or official opposition shadow cabinet) may have its own set of spokespersons and respective portfolios, although they are often considered during parliamentary debates with lesser courtesy than the government or official opposition's cabinets; in Ireland, for example, all parliamentary parties with at least 7 elected members have their own front benches, while those with less than 7 elected members must agree with other independent MPs to form a technical group in order to gain speaking rights.

Non-parliamentary party spokespersons
Non-parliamentary parties or parties with very few elected parliament members (that is, not enough to effectively spread policy communication duties) may also have their own non-parliamentary spokespersons and respective portfolios, despite not possessing speaking rights in parliament (or sometimes, as in extra-parliamentary opposition, abstaining from seeking office). They are more likely to speak for the party to media outlets or other organizations.

Organizational structure of political parties
Political occupations